Alfredo "Al" S. Panlilio is a Filipino businessman. He has been the Director, President and Chief Executive Officer of PLDT, Inc. since June 8, 2021 and wireless subsidiary Smart Communications, Inc. since August 8, 2019, where he embarked on an integrated transformation journey guided by a focus on customer experience.

Within the PLDT Group, Panlilio holds leadership positions in subsidiaries involved in ICT, digital banking, and more. During his previous tenure in PLDT before returning as its Chief Revenue Officer on July 1, 2019, Panlilio served as Senior Vice President from May 2001 to December 2010 and was the President of international arm PLDT Global from June 2004 to December 2010.

With PLDT as a longtime supporter of the Philippines’ digital transformation, Panlilio is among the founding members under the Digital Infrastructure pillar of the Private Sector Advisory Council (PSAC), formed in July 2022.

Prior to returning to PLDT Group, Panlilio was the Senior Vice President and Head of Customer Retail Services and Corporate Communications at Manila Electric Company (Meralco) from September 10, 2010 to June 30, 2019, and held designations in Meralco’s subsidiaries involved in renewable energy, multi-channel payments processing, and more.

A sports advocate, Panlilio sits as President of the MVP Sports Foundation, Second Vice President of FIBA Asia Central Board, First Vice President of the Philippine Olympic Committee and heads the FIBA Basketball World Cup 2023 local organizing committee. He is also the President of Samahang Basketbol ng Pilipinas (SBP). Panlilio is also the Treasurer of the National Golf Association of the Philippines (NGAP) and Manila Golf Country Club, Inc.

References

Living people
21st-century Filipino businesspeople
Filipino sports executives and administrators
PLDT people
Year of birth missing (living people)